The Lèze is a  long river in the Ariège and Haute-Garonne départements, southwestern France. Its source is in La Bastide-de-Sérou. It flows generally north. It is a left tributary of the Ariège into which it flows between Labarthe-sur-Lèze and Clermont-le-Fort.

Départements and communes along its course
This list is ordered from source to mouth: 
Ariège: La Bastide-de-Sérou, Aigues-Juntes, Gabre, Montégut-Plantaurel, Monesple, Pailhès, Artigat, Le Fossat, Sainte-Suzanne, Saint-Ybars
Haute-Garonne: Massabrac, Castagnac
Ariège: Lézat-sur-Lèze
Haute-Garonne: Saint-Sulpice-sur-Lèze, Montaut, Beaumont-sur-Lèze, Lagardelle-sur-Lèze, Vernet, Labarthe-sur-Lèze, Clermont-le-Fort

References

Rivers of France
Rivers of Ariège (department)
Rivers of Haute-Garonne
Rivers of Occitania (administrative region)